A white knight is a mythological figure and literary stock character. They are portrayed alongside a black knight as diametric opposites. A white knight usually represents a heroic warrior fighting against evil, with the role in medieval literature being represented by a knight-errant.

Mythology
The idea of a positive and negative color symbol being diametrically opposed is very common in ancient mythology, of which the white and black knights are one example, with others including the white horse and black horse from Indo-Aryan mythology. The white color symbolized innocence, illumination, openheartedness, and gladness.

Modern use

The term "white knight" is used in modern-day parlance to mean any kind of savior, although it is also specifically used in a business context to describe a person or corporation that saves another company from a hostile takeover and acquires its assets.

"White knight" is also used as derogatory slang, often by men's rights activists, to refer to men who are trying to curry the favor of women by protecting them, alongside other, similar terms, such as "simp" or "whipped". The usage of the term implies that men, when doing nice things for women, are motivated only by sexual desires.

The depiction of a morally pure white person and a nonwhite antagonist has been criticized as a modern use of the white knight trope that perpetuates racist attitudes.

Historical origins

Although the term 'white knight' has taken on a colloquial meaning in modern English, the White Knight was a historical noble title in the peerage of Ireland, first bestowed upon the Fitzgibbon family by King Edward III in 1333 AD. The other two Irish hereditary knighthoods are the Knight of Glin (also called the Black Knight), and the Knight of Kerry (also called the Green Knight).

See also
 Black knight
 Chivalry
 Damsel in distress
 Knight-errant

References

Fictional knights
Stock characters
Slang terms for people
Pejorative terms for men